Poimenesperus gillieri is a species of beetle in the family Cerambycidae. It was described by Villiers in 1959.

References

gillieri
Beetles described in 1959